Fred Thomas Burks (May 22, 1940 – October 19, 1998) was a farmer and Democratic Party politician in Tennessee, United States. He served in the Tennessee House of Representatives from 1970 until 1978, and in the Tennessee State Senate from 1978 until his assassination in 1998.

Biography
Born in Cookeville, Tennessee, Burks was one of the most conservative Democrats in the state legislature. He opposed the teaching of evolution in school science classes (twice introducing legislation to restrict its teaching), legal abortion, gambling, and a state lottery. His views seemed to have been very popular and in line with a large number of voters within his rural district.

Burks was an energetic legislator who almost never missed a floor or committee session. It is reported that he would on some occasions arrive at a session having already gotten up on his farm, delivered a load of hogs to Knoxville (approximately 90 miles east of his home) and then driven to the State Capitol in Nashville (100 miles west of his home and 190 miles west of Knoxville). Despite the 100-mile distance, and unlike most legislators from parts of the state a considerable distance from Nashville, Burks made it a practice to go home to his district and his farm almost every night, even during legislative sessions.

Assassination
Burks was assassinated by his Republican Party opponent Byron Looper less than a month before the next election. Burks was shot and killed by Looper on Burks' own property. An eyewitness to the murder helped seal the conviction of Looper, who was, at the time, Putnam County Tax Assessor. Burks' widow, Charlotte, ran for his seat and won, becoming the first Tennessee State Senator to win as a write-in candidate and one of very few American politicians to win as a write-in candidate. She was subsequently reelected in 2002, 2006, and 2010. The gun used to kill Burks was found by a highway work crew near Hwy 111 and Interstate 40, and is believed to have been thrown out of Looper's car window along I-40, between Monterey and Cookeville, following the murder.

Interstate 40 through Wilson, Smith, Putnam, and Cumberland counties is named the "Tommy Burks Memorial Highway".

See also
 List of assassinated American politicians

Notes

1940 births
1998 deaths
1998 murders in the United States
Male murder victims
Assassinated American politicians
Democratic Party members of the Tennessee House of Representatives
Democratic Party Tennessee state senators
People murdered in Tennessee
Deaths by firearm in Tennessee
People from Cookeville, Tennessee
20th-century American politicians
Assassinated American state senators